The axiological neutrality is a methodological position that the sociologist Max Weber offered in Politics as a Vocation, that aim for the researcher to become aware of his own values during his scientific work, to reduce as much as possible the biases that his own value judgements could cause. 

The demand developed by Max Weber is part of the criteria of scientific neutrality. 

The aim of the researcher in social sciences is to make research about subjects structured by values, while offering an analysis that will not be, itself, based on a value judgement. According to this concept, the researched should make of these values an “object”, without passing on them a prescriptive judgement.

In this way, Weber developed a distinction between “value judgement” and “link to the values”. The “link to the values” describes the action of analysis of the researcher who, by respecting the principle of the axiological neutrality, makes of cultural values several facts to analyse without venturing a prescriptive judgement on them, i. e. without passing a value judgement. 

The original term comes from the German werturteilsfreie Wissenschaft, and was introduced by Max Weber.

Bibliography
Max Weber, Max Weber on the Methodology of the Social Sciences , 1949

See also
 Fact-value distinction
 Empirical research
 Epistemology
 Ethnology
 Ethnocentrism
 Scientific method
 Objectivity (philosophy)

 Philosophy of science

References 

Max Weber
Methodology